John Waller (17 October 1824 – 7 April 1886) was an English first-class cricketer.

Waller was born at Camberwell in October 1824. He made his debut in first-class cricket for the Surrey Club against the Marylebone Cricket Club (MCC) at Lord's in 1853. He made two further first-class appearances for the Surrey Club in 1854 and 1855, both against the MCC, before playing his final first-class match for the Gentlemen of the South against the Gentlemen of the North in 1862 at The Oval. He scored a total of 35 runs across his four first-class matches, with a highest score of 21. He died in the United States at Brooklyn in April 1886.

References

External links

1824 births
1886 deaths
People from Camberwell
English cricketers
Surrey Club cricketers
Gentlemen of the South cricketers